The 2016 BYU Cougars softball team represents Brigham Young University in the 2016 NCAA Division I softball season.  Gordon Eakin entered the year as head coach of the Cougars for a 14th consecutive season. 2016 is the third season for the Cougars as members of the WCC in softball. The Cougars enter 2016 having won their last 7 conference championships and as the favorites in the WCC.

2016 Roster

Schedule 

|-
!colspan=10 style="background:#002654; color:#FFFFFF;"| Kajikawa Classic

 

|-
!colspan=10 style="background:#002654; color:#FFFFFF;"| Wilson/DeMari Desert Classic

|-
!colspan=10 style="background:#002654; color:#FFFFFF;"| Mary Nutter Collegiate Classic

|-
!colspan=10 style="background:#002654; color:#FFFFFF;"| Wildcat Invitational

|-
!colspan=10 style="background:#002654; color:#FFFFFF;"| University of Oklahoma Tournament 

|-
!colspan=10 style="background:#002654; color:#FFFFFF;"| Regular Season

|-
!colspan=10 style="background:#002654; color:#FFFFFF;"| San Diego Classic II

|-
!colspan=10 style="background:#002654; color:#FFFFFF;"| Regular Season

TV, Radio, and Streaming Information
Feb. 11: Brian Rice (radio- Tennessee)
Mar. 3: No commentators
Mar. 3: Derrick Palmer & 
Mar. 4: Derrick Palmer & 
Mar. 5: No commentators
Mar. 11: Chris Plank (radio-Oklahoma)
Mar. 12: Chris Plank (radio-Oklahoma)
Mar. 15: Krista Blunk & Kenzie Fowler
Mar. 22: Spencer Linton & Gary Sheide
Apr. 1: Tyler Denning & Megan Willis
Apr. 2: Tyler Denning & Megan Willis
Apr. 2: Tyler Denning & Megan Willis
Apr. 5: Spencer Linton & Gary Sheide
Apr. 5: Spencer Linton & Gary Sheide
Apr. 9: Robbie Bullough & Bailie Hicken
Apr. 13: Spencer Linton & Gary Sheide
Apr. 20: Josh Monsen (WAC DN)Robbie Bullough & Bailie Hicken (radio)
Apr. 22: Robbie Bullough & Bailie Hicken
Apr. 22: Robbie Bullough & Bailie Hicken
Apr. 23: Spencer Linton & Gary Sheide
Apr. 29: Paul Muyskens & Dustin Brakebill
Apr. 29: Paul Muyskens & Dustin Brakebill
Apr. 30: Paul Muyskens
May 3: Josh Martinez & Colton Gordon
May 6: Spencer Linton & Gary Sheide
May 6: Spencer Linton & Gary Sheide
May 7: Spencer Linton & Gary Sheide
May 19: Pam Ward & Cheri Kempf
May 20: Pam Ward & Cheri Kempf
May 20: Pam Ward & Cheri Kempf

External links 
 BYU Softball at byucougars.com

References 

2016 team
2016 in sports in Utah
2016 West Coast Conference softball season